Gregores or Gregore or variation, may refer to:

Characters
 Count Gregore, an onscreen TV persona of KFOR-TV
 Space Fighter Gregore, a character from episode 31 of Ultraman Dyna
 Gregore, Mayor of Lupusville, a character from The Real Ghostbusters; see List of The Real Ghostbusters episodes

People
 Gregore J. Sambor (1928–2015), U.S. police commissioner
 Gregore de Magalhães da Silva (born 1994), Brazilian soccer player
 , governor of the Territory of Santa Cruz; namesake of Gobernador Gregores, Santa Cruz, Argentina

Places
 Gobernador Gregores, a town in Santa Cruz, Argentina
 Gobernador Gregores Airport (Gregores Airport)
 Gobernador Gregores Beacon, located on the airport field

See also

 David McGregore (1710–1777), Presbyterian minister in colonial New England

 Gregoire (disambiguation)
 Gregor (disambiguation)
 Gregory (disambiguation)
 Greg (disambiguation)